Selena Gomez is an American actress, singer, and producer. She began her acting career by appearing on the children's television series Barney & Friends (2002–2004). She rose to prominence for her lead role as Alex Russo on the Emmy Award-winning Disney Channel television series, Wizards of Waverly Place (2007–2012). She had a leading role in the direct-to-video film Another Cinderella Story (2008), and won the Young Artist Award for Best Performance in a TV Movie — Leading Young Actress. In 2009, she had main roles in two Disney Channel films—Princess Protection Program and Wizards of Waverly Place: The Movie—the latter was cable's number-one scripted telecast of the year in total viewers and won a Primetime Emmy Award. Her first feature film starring role was in the film adaptation of the children's novel series by Beverly Cleary, Ramona and Beezus (2010), with Gomez portraying Beezus Quimby. The following year, she starred in the lead role of Grace, a teenager "mistaken for a socialite while on a trip to Paris", in the comedy film Monte Carlo.

Gomez was part of the main cast of the controversial Harmony Korine-directed crime film Spring Breakers (2012), starring James Franco. The film saw Gomez playing a more mature character than she did previously. It received generally positive reviews from critics, with some calling it a potential cult classic; it ranks in BBC's 100 Greatest Films of the 21st Century. She also voices the character of Mavis in the commercially successful Hotel Transylvania film franchise (2012–2022), which garnered over $1,36 billion at the box office. The follwing year, she starred opposite Ethan Hawke in the action thriller film Getaway, which was both critically and commercially unsuccessful. Gomez's acting credits include starring roles in the comedy-drama film The Fundamentals of Caring (2016) with Paul Rudd, the Jim Jarmusch-directed comedy horror film The Dead Don't Die (2019), and the romantic comedy A Rainy Day in New York (2019). In addition, she served as executive producer on the popular Netflix teen drama television series 13 Reasons Why (2017–2020). She also executive produces and stars in the HBO Max cooking series Selena + Chef (2020–2022).

Gomez stars in and executive produce the Emmy Award-winning Hulu mystery-comedy series Only Murders in the Building (2021–present), alongside Steve Martin and Martin Short. The series has received critical acclaim for its comedic approach to crime fiction. She received critical praise for her performance, and won the Satellite Award for Best Actress – Television Series Musical or Comedy; she was nominated for the Critics' Choice Television Award for Best Actress in a Comedy Series, the Golden Globe Award for Best Actress – Television Series Musical or Comedy, and two Screen Actors Guild Awards. Gomez was the focus of the 2022 Alek Keshishian-directed "raw and intimate" documentary film, Selena Gomez: My Mind & Me, which follows Gomez's life over the last six years.

Filmography

Film

Television

Web

Executive producer

Music videos

Guest appearances

References

External links
 

Actress filmographies
Videography
Videographies of American artists
American filmographies